Katrin Engel (born 2 May 1984, in Mistelbach) is an Austrian handballer playing for Thüringer HC and the Austrian national team. She has been the 2009 World Women's Handball Championship topscorer.

Achievements
Women Handball Austria:
Winner: 2002, 2003, 2004, 2005, 2008
ÖHB Cup:
Winner: 2002, 2003, 2004, 2005, 2008
Bundesliga:
Winner: 2007, 2011, 2012, 2013, 2014
German Cup:
Winner: 2010, 2011
EHF Champions League:
Finalist: 2008

References

External links
 Profile on Thüringer HC official website

Living people
Austrian female handball players
1984 births
People from Mistelbach
Expatriate handball players
Austrian expatriate sportspeople in Germany
Sportspeople from Lower Austria